The ComServe Wireless 150 was a NASCAR K&N Pro Series East race held in 2016 at Dominion Raceway. Spencer Davis won the race, driving for Ranier Racing with MDM.

History
With its opening in 2016, Dominion Raceway sanctioned a NASCAR K&N Pro Series East race on its opening weekend. Spencer Davis won the race in a close finish over Justin Haley.

Past winners

References

External links
 Dominion at NASCAR Home Tracks
 

ARCA Menards Series East
Former NASCAR races